During his tenure in the government of the United States, Joe Biden has made false or misleading claims. The frequency of these falsehoods became a subject of media discussion following his various runs for the presidency. Biden often repeats these statements even after media outlets discredits or fact-checks them.

Background
These statements have been characterized by Newsweek, Time Magazine, New York Times, Fox News, and MSNBC as "gaffes". Biden has called himself a "gaffe machine".

The most common explanations for these discrepancies are:
Joe Biden overcame a stutter that he had in his youth. Biden has denied this is the cause of these discrepancies, saying "the mistakes I make are mistakes".

His age and cognitive abilities have been questioned by media, as well as by fellow Democrats. White House doctors have examined him and found him to be physically and mentally fit.

Biden sometimes makes false claims in order to establish a connection with the ethnicity of an audience.

Examples

Before 2000 

 In the 1970s and 1980s, Biden claimed he participated in sit-ins along US Route 40 in 1961. In 1988, Biden admitted this is not true.
 On April 3, 1987, while campaigning for the 1988 Democrat presidential nomination in Claremont, New Hampshire, Biden claimed he attended law school on a full academic scholarship, and that he graduated in the top half of his class. On September 21, 1987, Biden admitted those claims are inaccurate.
 In 1988, Biden claimed his ancestors worked 12 hours a day underground mining coal. This claim was shown to be false.

2000s 

 In July 2006, Biden claimed that "you cannot go to a 7-Eleven or a Dunkin' Donuts unless you have a slight Indian accent. I'm not joking." After the clip went viral, a Biden aide dismissed the remark and explained he was making a point about diversity. Biden later said of the remark "it was meant as a compliment.
 In 2007, Biden claimed he was "shot at" in Iraq. A Biden aide told The Hill that he was not shot at in Iraq.
 In 2008, Biden claimed he was a coal miner.

2019 to 2021 

 On August 9, 2019, Biden said "poor kids are just as bright and just as talented as white kids" at a town hall in Des Moines hosted by the Asian & Latino Coalition. After a pause, he added "wealthy kids, black kids, Asian kids".
 On August 10, 2019, Biden claimed to have met with survivors of the Stoneman Douglas High School shooting while he was vice-president. Biden's vice-presidency ended on January 20, 2017; the shooting occurred on February 14, 2018, over a year later.
 On August 28, 2019 Biden claimed "I have never discussed with my son or my brother or anyone else anything having to do with their businesses, period." A January 2023 CNN report reviewed the data from Hunter Biden's laptop and determined that Joe Biden did have such discussions.
 On August 28, 2019, Biden told an audience in Hanover, New Hampshire that as vice-president he witnessed a four-star general pin a Silver Star medal to a Navy Captain in Afghanistan. According to Washington Post, "Biden got the time period, the location, the heroic act, the type of medal, the military branch and the rank of the recipient wrong, as well as his own role in the ceremony."
 On September 12, 2019, Biden claimed that the Obama administration "didn't lock people up in cages". This claim was rated "false" by Politifact.
 Biden claimed during the Democrat candidate debates on January 14, 2020 that he opposed the Iraq War from the beginning. This claim was repeated by Biden several times.
 Three times in February 2020, Biden claimed to have been arrested attempting to visit Nelson Mandela in Soweto along with the then-ambassador to South Africa, Andrew Young. Mandela was actually held in a prison on Robben Island, and Biden was not arrested while attempting to visit him.
 On February 25, 2020, Biden claimed that since 2007, 150 million Americans died from gun violence. A member of Biden's campaign staff said Biden meant 150,000 instead of 150 million.
 At a CNN town hall on February 16, 2021, Biden claimed that most illegal aliens in the United States are not Hispanic. More than two-thirds are indeed Hispanic. In the same town hall, he claimed more Chinese people are retired than working. This claim is false.
 On May 18, 2021, Biden claimed his great-grandfather was a coal miner despite correctly identifying his great-grandfather's occupation as mining engineer during his 2020 presidential campaign.
 On July 21, 2021, Biden made several false claims at a CNN town hall.
 On July 21, 2021 Biden claimed "If you’re vaccinated, you’re not going to be hospitalized, you’re not going to be in the IC unit, and you’re not going to die." This claim was shown to be false.
 In defending the 2021 withdrawal from Afghanistan, Biden claimed that Al Qaeda has been eliminated from Afghanistan. This claim was shown to be false.

2022 

 On January 19, 2022, CNN fact checked six claims from Biden's press conference to mark the end of his first year as president. Biden made false claims about a visit to a Pfizer vaccine plant, equipment shipped to Ukraine, progress on the US coronavirus vaccine response, medical billing, Russia's invasion of the Ukraine, and jobs creation.
 On January 20, 2022, CNN fact-checked several false claims about his past, Afghanistan, the economy, the coronavirus pandemic, the Southern Border crisis, Virginia political history, gun laws, tax breaks for racehorse owners, the Trump administration, and new laws regarding Georgia's elections.
 In his State of the Union address on March 1, 2022, and in an op-ed published May 30, 2022 in the Wall Street Journal, Biden claimed that his energy plan would reduce the average family's annual utility bills by $500. Washington Post rated the claim with "four Pinocchios".
 During his State of the Union address on March 1, 2022, Biden claimed that gun manufacturers are the only industry that can not be sued. CNN found that gun manufacturers can indeed be sued, and that there are other industries with some protection from liability.
 In August 2022, Biden claimed there was zero percent inflation. The United States Consumer Price Index at the time was 8.5%.
 On September 23, 2022, Biden claimed the average price of gas was $2.99 per gallon in 41 states. At the time, there were no states with average gas prices under $2.99 per gallon.
 In October 2022, Biden claimed that he got student debt relief passed by Congress. In fact, Congress did not pass such a bill, but Biden did take executive action, but this action was challenged in court.
 In a speech given October 27, 2022 in Syracuse, New York, Biden claimed that gas prices were over $5 per gallon on his first day. On his first day as president, gas was actually $2.39 per gallon.
 In October 2022, Biden claimed his son, Beau Biden, died in Iraq. Beau Biden died from a brain tumor in 2015. This claim was repeated on November 21, 2022.
 On November 1, 2022, Biden claimed credit for the 8.7% "cost of living allowance" increase for Social Security beneficiaries. In fact, the cost of living allowance is linked to the inflation rate by statute.
 During October and November 2022, Biden delivered speeches in support of Democrat candidates for the US 2022 US midterm elections. CNN found nine of these claims to be "false and misleading".
 In November 2022, Washington Post fact-checked several claims, and awarded Biden the "Bottomless Pinocchio", a rating given when a statement receives a three or four Pinocchio rating, and is repeated 20 times or more. The rating was established while Donald Trump was in office.
 On November 21, 2022, Biden falsely claimed that Delaware has more chickens than any other US state.
 On December 16, 2022, Biden claimed that as vice-president, his father, Joseph Biden Sr. asked that he award Frank Biden the Purple Heart, and that his uncle told him "I don't want the damn thing". Frank Biden died on November 28, 1999, and Joseph Biden Sr died on September 2, 2002.

2023 

 On January 26, 2023, Biden claimed in a speech "last year, we funded 700,000 major construction projects". A fact check by CNN found that the figure is 7,000. The White House corrected the transcript of the speech.
 On January 26, 2023, Biden claimed "we put a cap, and it’s now in effect – now in effect, as of January 1 – of $2,000 a year on prescription drug costs for seniors". A fact check by CNN found that the price cap takes effect in 2025.
 On January 26, 2023, Biden claimed that under former President Trump's administration, "only 3.5 million people had been – even had their first vaccination". A CNN fact check called the claim "misleading at best", and found that the actual number was 19 million people.
 On January 26, 2023, Biden claimed that billionaires "pay virtually only 3% of their income now – 3%, they pay". A CNN fact check found that billionaires in the USA pay an average of 8.2% of their income in federal income tax.
 On January 26, 2023, Biden claimed "the days are over when corporations are paying zero in federal taxes". A CNN fact check found this claim is "not true".
 On January 26, 2023, Biden claimed "wages are up, and they’re growing faster than inflation". A CNN fact check found that "real wages are lower today than they were both a full year ago and at the beginning of Biden’s presidency in January 2021".
 On March 13, 2023, Biden claimed his support of gay marriage began with an "epiphany" during his senior year in high school. Despite this claim, Biden opposed gay marriage until his 2008 run for the presidency.

Media response
After Biden's first 100 days as president, CNN wrote an article stating that compared with Trump, things were "quieter", and gave a "rough count" of 29 inaccurate claims. The article compared this to Donald Trump's count of 214 inaccurate claims in his first 100 days.

See also
Veracity of statements by Donald Trump

References

Gaffes
Gaffes
Biden, Joe gaffes